Zohreh Koudaei (born 24 November 1989) is an Iranian footballer who plays as a goalkeeper for the Iran national team.

International career 
Koudaei participated with the Iran national team in their qualification campaign for the 2022 AFC Women's Asian Cup qualification. She helped defeat Jordan in a decisive match, saving two penalties in penalty shoot-outs, to qualify Iran to the final tournament for the first time.

Jordan Football Association sex verification 
In November 2021, she attracted global attention when the Jordan Football Association (JFA), after losing a match in the 2022 AFC Women's Asian Cup qualification to Iran, accused her of being a male. The JFA filed a request for sex verification with the Asian Football Confederation. Koudaei announced her intention to file a complaint to FIFA against Jordan to restore her reputation.

References

External links
 

1989 births
Living people
People from Ahvaz
Bakhtiari people
Iranian women's footballers
Women's association football goalkeepers
Iran women's international footballers
Sportspeople from Khuzestan province
21st-century Iranian women